Events in the year 1981 in Cyprus.

Incumbents 

 President: Demetris Christofias
 President of the Parliament: Yiannakis Omirou

Events 
Ongoing – Cyprus dispute

 24 May – AKEL and the Democratic Rally both won 12 of the 35 seats in the parliament in parliamentary elections. Voter turnout was 95.7%.

Deaths

References 

 
1980s in Cyprus
Years of the 21st century in Cyprus
Cyprus
Cyprus
Cyprus